The AVN Award for Best Supporting Actor is an award that has been given annually by sex industry company AVN since the award's inception in 1984.

Till 2008, the award was awarded annually for two different categoriesfilm and video. From year 2009, it is awarded annually for a single category.

First recipient of the award was Richard Pacheco, who was awarded at 1st AVN Awards in 1984 for his performance in Nothing to Hide. As of 2023, Randy Spears is the most honoured pornographic actor with seven awards followed by Xander Corvus with four awards, while four pornographic actorsSteven St. Croix, Tony Tedeschi, Tom Byron and Tommy Pistol with three awards and nine pornographic actorsRichard Pacheco, Ron Jeremy, Jamie Gillis, Mike Horner, Jon Dough, Michael J. Cox, Wilde Oscar, Joey Silvera and Rick Savagehave won the award two times. Jamie Gillis is the oldest recipient of the award at the age of 55 for his performance in Forever Night (1999) and Xander Corvus is the youngest recipient of the award at the age of 23 for his performance in Star Trek:The Next Generation - A XXX Parody (2012). The most recent recipient is Tommy Pistol, who was honoured at the 40th AVN Awards in 2023 for his performance in Grinders.

Key

Winners and nominees

1980s

1990s

2000s

2010s

2020s

Superlatives

Multiple winners

See also
 AVN Award for Best Actor, an award that has been given by sex industry company AVN since the award's inception in 1984
 AVN Award for Male Performer of the Year, an award that has been given by sex industry company AVN since the award's inception in 1993
 AVN Award for Male Foreign Performer of the Year, an award that has been given by sex industry company AVN since the award's inception in 2003

References

External links
 

Awards established in 1984
Best Supporting Actor
Awards for male actors
Film awards for supporting actor